This article lists Christmas carols sung by the Filipinos during local Christmas season. As with much Filipino music, some of these songs have their origins in the Spanish and American colonial periods, with others written as part of the OPM movement.

"Himig ng Pasko"
"Himig Pasko" or "Himig ng Pasko" is a Christmas carol written by Serapio Y. Ramos in the 1960s. The opening line has become a popular allusion as it describes the Amihan, or cool, northeasterly trade winds that prevail around December.

"Namamasko"
"Namamasko" is part of a series known as Maligayang Pasko, and was originally an untitled song now commonly known by its incipit. Though more playful in tone as carolling is seen as a pastime reserved for children, its theme is similar to the English carol Here We Come A-wassailing/A-caroling.

"Ang Pasko Ay Sumapit"
"Maligayang Pasko at Masaganang Bagong Taon", popularly known as Ang Pasko ay Sumapit, is a traditional Filipino Christmas song. It was originally composed by Vicente D. Rubi and Mariano Vestil in 1933 as Kasadya ning Táknaa. A version of the song in Tagalog was used by Josefino Cenizal as a marching song for Ang Pugad ng Aguila ("Hawk's Nest") in 1938. National Artist Levi Celerio also wrote Tagalog lyrics to the song during the 1950s. The song is still sung today in various communities, especially in churches both in the Philippines and abroad.

"Pasko Na Naman"
"Pasko Na Naman" is a Filipino Christmas carol written by lyricist Levi Celerio and composer Felipe Padilla de León.

Other songs
"Christmas in Our Hearts" (1990), written by composer Jose Mari Chan and lyricist Rina Cañiza
"Kumukutikutitap" (1987), written by Ryan Cayabyab
"Noche Buena" (1965), written by composer Felipe Padilla de León and lyricist Levi Celerio
"Pasko Na Sinta Ko" (1982), written by Francis Dandan
"Pasko Na!" (1987), written by Onofre Pagsanghan, Norman Agatep and Jandi Arboleda and music by Manoling Francisco, SJ
"Pasko ng Paglaya" (1987), written by Jandi Arboleda and music by Manoling Francisco, SJ
"Emmanuel" (1987), written by George Gozum and music by Manoling Francisco, SJ
"Gumising" (1987), written by Onofre Pagsanghan and music by Manoling Francisco, SJ
"Himig ng Hangin" (1987), written by Jandi Arboleda and music by Norman Agatep
"Noong Paskong Una" (1987), written by Onofre Pagsanghan and music by Manoling Francisco, SJ
"Christmas Won't Be The Same Without You" (1988), written by Martin Nievera
"Narito Na Ang Pasko" (1988), written by Manoling Francisco, SJ
"A Perfect Christmas" (1990), written by Jose Mari Chan
"Miss Kita Kung Christmas" (1978), written by Hermie Uy and Fe M. Ayala
"Tuloy Na Tuloy Pa Rin ang Pasko" (1989), written by Andrei Dionisio
"Pasko Para Sa Lahat" (1990), written by Vehnee Saturno
"A Wish on Christmas Night" (1990), written by Jose Mari Chan with additional lyrics by Pinky Valdez
"Sa Araw ng Pasko" (1998), written by Vehnee Saturno
"Kung Kailan Pasko" (1998), written by Vehnee Saturno
"Di Ba't Pasko'y Pag-ibig?" (1999), written by Vehnee Saturno
"Sana Ngayong Pasko" (1993), written by Jimmy Borja
"Silent Night Na Naman" (1993), written by Vehnee Saturno
"Bituin" (1999), written by Arnel Aquino, SJ
"Pasko ng Pag-Ibig" (2010), written by Lui Morano and music by Norman Agatep
"Sa Pasko Sana'y Magbalik" (1998), written by Freddie Saturno
"Noo'y Pasko Rin" (1998), written by Freddie Saturno and Tito Cayamanda 
"A Christmas Greeting" (1998), written by Larry Hermoso
"Ngayong Pasko" (1998), written by Larry Hermoso
"Soon It's Christmas" (1998), written by Jimmy Borja
"Boom Tarat Tarat (Pasko Na)" (2006), written by Lito Camo
"Pasko sa Pinas" (2006), written by Yeng Constantino
"Bro, Ikaw ang Star ng Pasko" (2009), written by Robert Labayen and music by Amber Davis and Marcus Davis, Jr.
"Ngayong Pasko, Magningning ang Pilipino" (2010), written by Lloyd Oliver Corpuz and music by Jordan Constantino
"Da Best Ang Pasko ng Pilipino" (2011), written by Robert Labayen and music by Jimmy Antiporda
"Kwento ng Pasko" (2012), written by Robert Labayen and music by Amber Davis and Marcus Davis, Jr.
"Magkasama Tayo sa Kwento ng Pasko" (2013), written by Robert Labayen and music by Jumbo de Belen
"Share the Love" (2014), written by Brian James Camaya and music by Arlene Calvo
"Thank You Ang Babait Ninyo" (2014), written by Robert Labayen, Love Rose de Leon and Lloyd Oliver Corpuz and music by Amber Davis and Marcus Davis, Jr.
"Magmahalan Tayo Ngayong Pasko" (2015), written by Brian James Camaya and music by Simon Peter Tan
"Thank You For The Love" (2015), written by Robert Labayen and music by Thyro Alfaro and Yumi Lacsamana
"Isang Pamilya Tayo Ngayong Pasko" (2016), written by Robert Labayen and music by Thyro Alfaro and Yumi Lacsamana
"Magic ng Pasko" (2016), written by Brian James Camaya and Nicolle Castillo and music by Ann Margaret Figueroa
"Buong Pusong MaGMAhalan" (2017), written by Arlene Calvo, Brian James Camaya, Jolly Conopio and Jann Lopez
"Just Love" (2017), written by Robert Labayen, Lloyd Oliver Corpuz and Christian Faustino and music by Jimmy Antiporda
"Family is Love" (2018), written by Robert Labayen and Lloyd Oliver Corpuz and music by Amber Davis and Marcus Davis, Jr.
"Puso ng Pasko" (2018), written by Brian James Camaya and Rexy Jolly Conopio and music by Ann Figueroa
"Family is Forever" (2019), written by Robert Labayen, Lloyd Oliver Corpuz and Thyro Alfaro and music by Thyro Alfaro and Lloyd Oliver Corpuz
"Love Shines" (2019), written by Brian James Camaya, Rexy Jolly Conopio and Jann Lopez and music by Natasha Correos
"Ikaw ang Liwanag at Ligaya" (2020), written by Robert Labayen and Love Rose De Leon and music by Thyro Alfaro
"Isang Puso Ngayong Pasko" (2020), written by Rexy Jolly Conopio and music by Natasha Correos
"Andito Tayo Para Sa Isa't Isa" (2021), written by Love Rose De Leon, Robert Labayen and Thyro Alfaro and music by Thyro Alfaro and Xeric Tan
"Love Together, Hope Together" (2021), written by Brian James Camaya, Emman Rivera and Jann Lopez and music by Simon Peter Tan
"Love Is Us This Christmas" (2022), written by Emman Rivera and Jann Fayel Lopez and music by Ann Margaret Figueroa
"Tayo ang Ligaya ng Isa't Isa" (2022), written by Robert Labayen and music by Jonathan Manalo

See also
 List of Christmas carols

Notes and references

External links
Filipino traditional Christmas songs

Filipino
Christmas in the Philippines